William Henry Horne (19 April 1885 – 1930) was an English footballer who played in the Southern League for Plymouth Argyle and Fulham. He was a goalkeeper. Horne served with the Duke of Cornwall's Light Infantry in South Africa during the Second Boer War.

Life and career
Horne was born in Plympton. He served with the Duke of Cornwall's Light Infantry in South Africa during the Second Boer War before returning to play football in Devon and Cornwall. Horne played for Tavistock and Essa prior to joining Plymouth Argyle on amateur terms in January 1904. He served as understudy to Jack Robinson in his first season and made three appearances before signing a professional contract. He became the club's first choice goalkeeper during the 1904–05 season but eventually lost his place in the team after Argyle signed England international John Willie Sutcliffe. Horne joined Fulham in May 1906 and made three appearances in his one season with the club.

He returned to Argyle the following year and spent the next four seasons as understudy to Sutcliffe. Horne became the club's first choice again in 1911–12 and the following season he received a Southern League winners medal. He made his last appearance for Argyle in November 1914 before losing his place in the side to Fred Craig. His career was then interrupted by the outbreak of war as competitive football was suspended in 1915. Horne remained on the club's books and was a member of the squad for the 1919–20 season, serving as back-up to Craig, but did not add to his 240 appearances for Argyle in all competitions and then retired due to ill health. Horne died in Plymouth in 1930.

Honours
Western League First Division: 1904–05
Southern League First Division: 1912–13

References

1885 births
People from Plympton
British Army personnel of the Second Boer War
Duke of Cornwall's Light Infantry soldiers
English footballers
Association football goalkeepers
Tavistock A.F.C. players
Plymouth Argyle F.C. players
Fulham F.C. players
Southern Football League players
Western Football League players
1930 deaths
Child soldiers